Gavin Lane (born 26 November 1966) is a retired South African football (soccer) defender. He played professionally for Giant Blackpool, Orlando Pirates, Moroka Swallows and AmaZulu and also represented South Africa.

During his career he was nicknamed "Stability Unit" and was a member of Orlando Pirates 1995 African Cup of Champions Clubs winning squad.

After retirement
Gavin Lane used to work as a contract manager at a renovation company, Gordon Verhoef & Krause.
Gavin now owns a painting and renovations company called Gavin Lane Projects .

Personal life
He lives in Durban  with his wife Lesley and his two sons, Kyle Lane (born 1989) and Devin Lane (born 1993).

References

1966 births
Living people
Association football defenders
South African soccer players
People from Boksburg
Orlando Pirates F.C. players
AmaZulu F.C. players
South Africa international soccer players
White South African people
Moroka Swallows F.C. players
Giant Blackpool players
Sportspeople from Gauteng